A galactic empire is a common trope used in science fantasy and science fiction.

Galactic Empire or Galactic Empires may  also refer to:

Fictional entities
Galactic Empire (Isaac Asimov), in Isaac Asimov's books
Galactic Empire (LOGH), in Legend of the Galactic Heroes
Galactic Empire (Star Wars)

Literature
Galactic Empire series, three novels by Isaac Asimov
Galactic Empires (anthology), six novellas edited by Gardner Dozois, 2008

Games
Galactic Empire (1980 video game), for the TRS-80
Galactic Empire (1990 video game), for the Amiga and MS-DOS
Galactic Empire for The Major BBS bulletin board
Galactic Empires, a collectible card game

See also

List of fictional galactic communities
Galactic Alliance (disambiguation)
Galactic Federation (disambiguation)
Galactic republic (disambiguation)